Tracey Edgar "Tom" Wenborn (20 June 1880 – 22 March 1944) was an Australian rules footballer who played with South Melbourne in the Victorian Football League (VFL).

Family
The son of Charles Francis Wenborn, and Mary Selina Wenborn, née Wilson, Tracey Edgar Wenborn was born in Prahran, Victoria on 20 June 1880.

He married Georgina Riddell in 1912.

Football

Brighton (VFA)
He was the captain of the Brighton Football Club in the Victorian Football Association (VFA) in 1909 and 1911.

Death
He died at Middle Brighton on 22 March 1944.

Notes

External links 
 
 
 The VFA Project: Thomas Wenborn. 

1880 births
1944 deaths
Australian rules footballers from Melbourne
Australian Rules footballers: place kick exponents
Sydney Swans players
Brighton Football Club players
People from Prahran, Victoria